Events from the year 1934 in China.

Incumbents
President: Lin Sen
Premier: Wang Jingwei
Vice Premier: Kung Hsiang-hsi

Events
April 10 - Fifth Encirclement Campaign against Jiangxi Soviet: Nationalists begin attack on Communist stronghold of Guangchang.
April 19 - Communist launch failed attack on Nationalists at Daluoshan. Communist strongholds at Ganzhu and Yanfuzhang taken by Nationalists.
April 27 - Nationalists capture Guangchang, inflicting 5,500 casualties on the Communists.
October - Start of Long March

Births
 January 1 – Mona Fong, Hong Kong film producer and manager (d. 2017)
 March 10 – Fou Ts'ong, pianist (d. 2020)
 July 17 – Lucio Tan, Chinese-Filipino billionaire businessman, educator

Deaths
September 14 - Wang Zhanyuan
November 13 - Shi Liangcai

References 

 
1930s in China
Years of the 20th century in China